Positioning may refer to:
 Positioning (marketing), creating an identity in the minds of a target market
 Positioning theory, a theory in social psychology
 Positioning (critical literacy), reader context
 Positioning (telecommunications), a technology to approximate where a mobile phone temporarily resides
 Grappling position, the positioning and holds of combatants engaged in grappling
 Geopositioning, determining the location of an object in space

See also
 Position (disambiguation)
 Real-time locating